Bolton Lake is a lake in the James Bay drainage basin in the municipality of Black River-Matheson in Cochrane District, Ontario, Canada. The primary outflow is Burdick creek to the Black River, which flows via the Abitibi River and the Moose River to James Bay.

See also
List of lakes in Ontario

References

Lakes of Cochrane District